1,5-Dithiacyclooctane (DTCO) is an organosulfur compound with the formula (CHCH)CHS).  This cyclic dithioether is a colorless oil that is soluble in polar solvents. It forms a variety of transition metal thioether complexes. 

DTO can be oxidized to the bicyclic dication.  

DTCO was first prepared in 4% yield by dialkylation of 1,3-propanedithiol with 1,3-dibromopropane.

References

Thioethers
Chelating agents
Sulfur heterocycles
Heterocyclic compounds with 1 ring